Scarred For Life is the third studio album by Australian hard rock band Rose Tattoo. The album was released in October 1982 and peaked at number 11 on the Kent Music Report. Scarred for Life launched Rose Tattoo to international success with the rock anthem "We Can't Be Beaten".

"We Can't Be Beaten" was covered by Swiss thrash metal act Drifter on their 1989 album Nowhere to Hide and features a guest appearance by Motörhead guitarist Phil Campbell.

Track listing
 "Scarred for Life" (Anderson, Riley, Royall) – 3:50
 "We Can't Be Beaten" (Anderson, Riley) – 3:05
 "Juice on the Loose" (Anderson, Wells) – 3:57
 "Who's Got the Cash" (Anderson, Wells) – 3:57
 "Branded" (Anderson, Riley) – 6:44
 "Texas" (Anderson, Wells) – 3:09
 "It's Gonna Work Itself Out" (Anderson, Riley) – 3:58
 "Sydney Girls" (Anderson, Wells) – 3:31
 "Dead Set" (Anderson, Leach) – 3:15
 "Revenge" (Anderson, Wells) – 3:36

Personnel
 Angry Anderson – lead vocals
 Peter Wells – slide guitar and vocals
 Rob Riley – lead and rhythm guitar
 Geordie Leach – bass
 Dallas "Digger" Royall – drums
 Sam Horsburgh Jnr. – engineer
 Col Freeman – mixdown engineer

Charts

References

1982 albums
Albert Productions albums